Alaena oberthuri is a butterfly in the family Lycaenidae. It is found in the Democratic Republic of the Congo (from the south-eastern part of the country to Haut-Lomami). The species was first described by Per Olof Christopher Aurivillius in 1899.

References

O
Butterflies of Africa
Endemic fauna of the Democratic Republic of the Congo
Haut-Lomami
Fauna of Southern Africa
Butterflies described in 1899
Taxa named by Per Olof Christopher Aurivillius